Anouk Vetter (born 4 February 1993) is a Dutch athlete who specialises in the heptathlon. She holds the Dutch record in heptathlon of 6867 points. She won a gold medal at the heptathlon at the 2016 European Championships. and a silver medal at the 2020 Summer Olympics.

Early life
Anouk Vetter was on born 4 February 1993 in Amsterdam in the Netherlands. Anouk was exposed to athletics at a very young age. Her father, Ronald Vetter, is a long-standing athletics coach and her mother, Gerda Vetter-Blokziel a two-time Dutch javelin champion. "I grew up on the track, running around from the age of four and five playing on the high jump mat," she recalls.

Career

Her passion became the heptathlon. However, her frail body was susceptible to injury. She failed to finish a heptathlon at either the 2011 European Athletics Junior Championships, 2012 World Junior Championships in Athletics and the 2013 European Athletics U23 Championships. After replacing her coach in 2012 with her father, he decreased her training to 80 per cent compared to the other women in the combined event group to protect her fragile body. She won the Multistars Firenze Trofeo Zerneri Acciai, the opening meeting of the 2013 IAAF Combined Events Challenge with 5872 points.

Her breakthrough came in 2014 when she improved her previous personal best by a massive 444 points to 6316 points at that year's prestigious Hypo Meeting in Gotzis (Austria) to place 9th. "Gotzis was really special," she remembered. "It is always fantastic to compete there because the crowd is so close to the track." Later that year she finished 7th at the 2014 European Championships in Zurich.

In 2015 she finished 6th at that in Gotzis with a new personal best with 6458 points, and won the heptathlon at the Mehrkampf-Meeting in Ratingen (Germany).  Despite an injury, Vetter also competed in the heptathlon event at the 2015 World Championships in Athletics in Beijing, China, where she reached the 12th place with 6267 points. "Bearing in mind I didn’t think I could even start the competition, mentally it was a really big step for me," she reflected later.

She started the 2016 season with an 8th place in Gotzis. In July 2016, she won a surprise victory at the 2016 European Athletics Championships heptathlon in her home town Amsterdam, with a score of 6626 points, an improvement of the national record of Dafne Schippers. "To win that European title was amazing," she remembered. "Suddenly I was out of the shadow of the big girls." At the 2016 Summer Olympics, however, she finished on a disappointing 10th place.

She started the 2017 outdoor season with a 7th place in Gotzis. In August 2017, she set a new national heptathlon record of 6636 points at the World Championships in London, where she won the bronze medal, behind 2016 Olympic champion Nafissatou Thiam (gold) and Carolin Schäfer (silver). She concluded the season with a win at the heptathlon at the Décastar in Talence (France). For the second year in a row she finished 2nd in the IAAF Combined Events Challenge.

At the 2018 Hypo Meeting in Gotzis she finished 4th behind Nafissatou Thiam, Yorgelis Rodriguez and Erica Bougard.

International competitions

Personal bests

References

External links

Anouk Vetter, homepage

1993 births
Athletes (track and field) at the 2016 Summer Olympics
Dutch heptathletes
European Athletics Championships medalists
Living people
Olympic athletes of the Netherlands
Olympic heptathletes
Athletes from Amsterdam
World Athletics Championships athletes for the Netherlands
World Athletics Championships medalists
Dutch Athletics Championships winners
Athletes (track and field) at the 2020 Summer Olympics
Medalists at the 2020 Summer Olympics
Olympic silver medalists for the Netherlands
Olympic silver medalists in athletics (track and field)
21st-century Dutch women